Alain Tassé is a politician in Montreal, Quebec, Canada. He served on the Montreal city council from 2005 to 2013, initially as a member of the Montreal Island Citizens Union (MICU)/Union Montreal (UM) party and later as an independent. From 2012 to 2013, he was a member of the Montreal executive committee (i.e., the municipal cabinet). At an earlier time in his life, he held a leading position in the New Democratic Party in Quebec and was a candidate for the House of Commons of Canada.

Private career
Tassé's 2013 campaign literature identified him as the owner of a property management firm specializing in the oversight of non-profit housing.

New Democratic Party activist
Tassé was a candidate for the Canadian House of Commons in the 1988 Canadian federal election, running for the New Democratic Party in Verdun—Saint-Paul. He finished third against Progressive Conservative Gilbert Chartrand.

The New Democratic Party experienced serious internal divisions in 1989 over the nature and extent of its support for the proposed Meech Lake Accord on constitutional reform. In December 1989, delegates at the party's convention voted to seek improvements to the accord via a series of amendments. This decision was opposed by many Quebec delegates, particularly those who identified as Quebec nationalists and who opposed any changes to the original text. Tassé was among those opposing the decision; he was quoted as saying, "I'm a socialist before I'm a nationalist, but I remain a (Quebec) nationalist."

Tassé was chosen as interim president of the federal wing of the New Democratic Party in Quebec in June 1990. He stood down from the position in early 1991 and became special assistant on Quebec issues to federal party leader Audrey McLaughlin, a position he continued to hold through to the 1993 Canadian federal election. In June 1991, he was involved in developing a compromise resolution on constitutional reform intended to win support for the party in both Quebec and Western Canada.

Municipal politician
Tassé unsuccessfully sought election to the Verdun city council in 1985, running as a candidate of the Parti contre l'annexion de Verdun (Verdun Anti-Annexation Party), which opposed a proposed merger of Verdun with Montreal. He was elected in the 1993 municipal election as a member of Georges Bossé's Parti d'action municipale (Municipal Action Party) and served for the next four years. He sought re-election in 1997 but was defeated.

Verdun was subsequently annexed to Montreal on January 1, 2002, and Tassé was elected to the Montreal city council in 2005, winning in the Desmarchais-Crawford division in that year's municipal election. The Montreal Island Citizens Union won a majority on council, and Tassé served as a backbench supporter of Gérald Tremblay administration. He was re-elected in the 2009 election, which was won by Tremblay's renamed Union Montreal party. Following this election, Tassé served on the city's task force dealing with bedbug infestations and oversaw the establishment of an open-data portal for municipal information.

The Union Montreal party fell into crisis in late 2012, after serious allegations of corruption were made about the party at the Charbonneau Commission. Tassé was one of the first councillors to resign from the party following these revelations, serving as an independent on council as of November 2012. Following Tremblay's resignation as mayor, city council voted to choose a replacement, and Tassé supported Michael Applebaum's successful bid for the position. On November 22, 2012, Applebaum named Tassé to his executive committee with responsibility for economic development and urbanization. He retained these responsibilities when Laurent Blanchard succeeded Applebaum as mayor on June 25, 2013, and also gained responsibility for the oversight of water.

In January 2013, Tassé announced the beginning of a long-term renewal plan for a derelict area in the northern section of Montreal's Parc Avenue. He indicated that the plan was to turn a former "no man's land" area into a mixed-use neighbourhood, with some continued industrial and commercial presence. He also defended the city's decision to authorize condominium towers in Griffintown without public consultation, saying that the buildings would be an improvement over what had been there previously.

Tassé speculated that he might contest the 2013 municipal election as part of a group of independents in Verdun, but he ultimately supported Marcel Côté's bid for mayor and joined the Coalition Montréal party. Under this party's banner, he ran for borough mayor of Verdun and finished fourth against Jean-François Parenteau of Équipe Denis Coderre pour Montréal. Tassé's term on the executive committee ended when Blanchard's administration stood down from office.

Electoral record
Municipal (Montreal)

Municipal (Verdun)

Federal

References

Living people
Montreal city councillors
People from Verdun
Year of birth missing (living people)